Wout Felix Lina Faes (born 3 April 1998) is a Belgian professional footballer who plays as centre-back for Premier League club Leicester City and the Belgium national team.

A promising talent from the Anderlecht academy, Faes gained attention as captain of Belgian national youth teams. He made his senior debut on loan with Heerenveen in the Eredivisie, but never experienced his breakthrough with Anderlecht. As a result, he moved to Oostende, where he was able to grow into a solid starter. In January 2020, Faes was signed by Ligue 1 club Reims.

Club career

Anderlecht

Early years
Faes moved to the Anderlecht youth academy from Lierse in 2012. He could then count on interest from Premier League club Chelsea and Manchester United, but he still signed his first professional contract with Anderlecht. From the 2015–16 season, Faes began practicing regularly with the club's first team. A month after he took bronze with Belgium U17 at the 2015 FIFA U-17 World Cup, he extended his contract with Anderlecht. Faes reached the semi-finals of the UEFA Youth League with the club in both the 2014–15 season and the 2015–16 season, with him captaining the team in the latter campaign.

Loans
Anderlecht sent Faes on loan to Dutch Eredivisie club Heerenveen for the second half of the 2016–17 season. Anderlecht did not include an option to buy. Faes made his debut in the Eredivisie on 1 April 2017. He came on as a substitute against Heracles Almelo in the 35th minute for Reza Ghoochannejhad. The defender then received a place in the starting lineup in all remaining games of the regular season. His last match for Heerenveen was the first leg of the semi-final of the play-offs for European football against Utrecht. Heerenveen ultimately lost twice to Utrecht, which meant that the club missed out on UEFA Europa League participation that season.

On his return to Anderlecht, Faes was immediately demoted to the C-team by the new head coach René Weiler. On 12 July 2017, it was announced that Excelsior had signed Faes on a one-season loan deal. Shortly after his arrival, Faes was joined by a fellow countryman in Jinty Caenepeel. The first three matchdays, Faes was in the starting lineup of head coach Mitchell van der Gaag, who emphasized defensive football, but afterwards he received less playing time due to the renewal of Jordy de Wijs's loan deal. Despite the fact that De Wijs formed a very strong central defensive duo with Jurgen Mattheij that season, Faes made nineteen league appearances in the Eredivisie that season.

Oostende
In the summer of 2018, Faes decided to permanently leave Anderlecht as he signed a three-year contract with first-tier club Oostende, where he was reunited with Gert Verheyen, his former coach from the national youth teams. It was also Verheyen who had insisted on the club signing Faes. In Ostend, Faes grew into a regular in the centre of the defense. In his first season, he missed only five league games, three of which were due to suspension and two due to a minor foot injury. He also reached the semi-finals of the Belgian Cup with the club, in which the club was only knocked out after a penalty-shootout against Gent.

Faes was also an important force at Oostende in the 2019–20 season, who, however, experienced a rough season. During the first half of the season, Faes' name regularly emerged in media as a potential sale object. Faes, who played a good first half of the season and regularly wore the captain's armband, was eventually sold on 31 January 2020 to the French Ligue 1 club Reims. Reims let Faes finish the season at Oostende on loan, who at that time were still involved in a relegation battle. The club was ultimately able regain themselves in the top-tier Belgian First Division A, although the club had not yet been mathematically saved when the competition was stopped due to the COVID-19 pandemic.

Reims
After officially joining Reims from the start of the 2020–21 season, Faes made his Ligue 1 debut on 23 August 2020 in a 2–2 away draw against Monaco, in which he played the full match. On 1 November, he scored his first goal for the club in a 2–1 home win over Strasbourg; a powerful header from a corner-kick taken by Valon Berisha. He finished his first season with Reims with 35 appearances in which he scored two goals, as the club finished 14th in the league. Faes also featured in the Europa League qualifiers with Reims, who were eventually knocked out by Fehérvár in the third round.

Leicester City
On 1 September 2022, Faes joined Premier League club Leicester City on a five-year deal for a reported fee of £15 million. He made his debut for the club in a 6–2 loss against Tottenham on 17 September. Faes was praised for his impact on the club's defence since his debut and in the seven Premier League games since the match against Tottenham, City recorded five clean sheets. On 30 December 2022, in a 2–1 loss vs Liverpool, Faes became the fourth player in Premier League history to score two own goals in the same match.

International career
Faes' first taste of international tournament football was with Belgium U17s at the 2015 U-17 World Cup in Chile.

He was called up to the senior Belgium squad for 2022 FIFA World Cup qualification matches, on 13 and 16 November against Estonia and Wales respectively, and was an unused substitute in the Wales match.  Together with Leicester City teammates, Timothy Castagne and Youri Tielemans, he was subsequently called up to Belgium's 2022 FIFA World Cup finals squad in November 2022.

Career statistics

Honours
Belgium U17
FIFA U-17 World Cup third place: 2015

Individual
 Stade de Reims Player of the Season: 2021–22
 2015 UEFA European Under-17 Championship Team of the Tournament

References

External links
Profile at the Leicester City F.C. website

1998 births
Living people
People from Mol, Belgium
Footballers from Antwerp Province
Belgian footballers
Association football defenders
Lierse S.K. players
R.S.C. Anderlecht players
SC Heerenveen players
Excelsior Rotterdam players
K.V. Oostende players
Stade de Reims players
Leicester City F.C. players
Belgian Pro League players
Eredivisie players
Ligue 1 players
Premier League players
Belgium youth international footballers
Belgium under-21 international footballers
Belgium international footballers
2022 FIFA World Cup players
Belgian expatriate footballers
Expatriate footballers in France
Expatriate footballers in the Netherlands
Expatriate footballers in England
Belgian expatriate sportspeople in France
Belgian expatriate sportspeople in the Netherlands
Belgian expatriate sportspeople in England